Erwin Halletz (Vienna, 12 July 1923 – 27 October 2008) also performed as René Roulette, was an Austrian orchestra leader and songwriter.

Songs
Uncle Satchmo's Lullaby "Onkel Satchmo's Lullaby") is a 1959
Einmal komm' ich wieder
Vielleicht geschieht ein Wunder  lyricist Peter Wehle
Connie Francis Sings German Favorites "Immer und überall" Erwin Halletz, Peter Wehle
Spectrum (Illinois Jacquet album) "I Remember Her So Well"

Selected filmography
 His Daughter is Called Peter (1955)
 Request Concert (1955)
 Liane, Jungle Goddess (1956)
 The Tour Guide of Lisbon (1956)
 The Daring Swimmer (1957)
 The Star of Santa Clara (1958)
 La Paloma (1959)
 Isola Bella (1961)
 Our Crazy Aunts (1961)
 Our Crazy Nieces (1963)
 Our Crazy Aunts in the South Seas (1964)
 The Last Ride to Santa Cruz (1964)
 Fanny Hill (1964)
 Lana, Queen of the Amazons (1964)
 The Treasure of the Aztecs (1965)
The Pyramid of the Sun God (1965) 
 Who Wants to Sleep? (1965)
 Maigret and His Greatest Case (1966)
 When Night Falls on the Reeperbahn (1967)
 The Doctor of St. Pauli (1968)
 On the Reeperbahn at Half Past Midnight (1969)
 The Priest of St. Pauli (1970)
 That Can't Shake Our Willi! (1970)
 Hotel by the Hour (1970)
 Twenty Girls and the Teachers (1971)
 The Mad Aunts Strike Out (1971)
 Shocking Asia (1974)
 Shocking Asia II: The Last Taboos (1985)

External links

References

1923 births
2008 deaths